"Still Breathing" is a song by Samanta Tīna. It was chosen to represent Latvia in the Eurovision Song Contest 2020, before the contest was cancelled due to the 2019–20 coronavirus pandemic. The song was released as a digital download on 28 November 2019.

Eurovision Song Contest

The song was chosen to represent Latvia in the Eurovision Song Contest 2020, after Samanta Tīna was selected through Supernova 2020, the music competition that selects Latvia's entries for the Eurovision Song Contest. On 28 January 2020, a special allocation draw was held which placed each country into one of the two semi-finals, as well as which half of the show they would perform in. Latvia was placed into the second semi-final, to be held on 14 May 2020, and was scheduled to perform in the second half of the show. The contest, however, was cancelled on 18 March 2020 due to the 2019–20 coronavirus pandemic.

Track listing

Release history

References

2020 singles
2020 songs
Eurovision songs of 2020
Eurovision songs of Latvia
Samanta Tīna songs
Songs written by Aminata Savadogo